Down the Rabbit Hole is a metaphor for adventure into the unknown, from its use in Alice's Adventures in Wonderland. It may also refer to:

Books
 Down the Rabbit Hole (novel), the first book in the Echo Falls mystery series, by Peter Abrahams
 Down the Rabbit Hole (memoir), by television personality and model Holly Madison

Events
 Down the Rabbit Hole (festival), annual music festival in the Netherlands

Language
 Down the rabbit hole, English language idiom

Television
 "Down the Rabbit Hole", the fifth episode of the fourth season of CSI:NY
 "Down the Rabbit Hole" (Once Upon a Time in Wonderland), the first episode of Once Upon a Time in Wonderland
 "Down the Rabbit Hole", the fourteenth episode of the fourth season of The Vampire Diaries
 "Down the Rabbit Hole and Back Again", the third episode of anime series InuYasha

Recordings
 "Down the Rabbit Hole," track on Scenes from Alice in Wonderland EP with Jane Asher as Alice and Full Cast Argo  UK	1963
 "Down the Rabbit Hole," a bonus track on the Adam Lambert album For Your Entertainment

Video games
 "Down the Rabbit Hole," the seventeenth mission of video game Call of Duty: Modern Warfare 3
 "Down the Rabbit Hole," the first chapter of visual novel Wonderful Everyday

See also
 Rabbit hole (disambiguation)
 What the Bleep Do We Know!?, released on DVD as Down the Rabbit Hole